The constitutional complaint is a remedy found in Germany for protection of constitutional rights. It derives from Article 93 Sec. 1 Nr. 4a of the Basic Law. It resembles in certain respects the amparo remedy available in some Spanish-speaking nations.

The constitutional complaint is an extraordinary remedy for the protection of constitutional rights. These are the basic rights (Art. 1 - 19 GG) and certain related rights (Art. 20 Sec. 4, Art. 33, Art. 38, Art. 101, Art. 103, Art. 104 GG).

The constitutional complaint originally was only part of a federal law (§§ 90 ff. BVerfGG) and not part of the constitution itself. Yet it was incorporated in the Constitution in 1969, because at the same time the so-called Notstandsverfassung (regulations for the case of emergency and war) was incorporated in the constitution. In case of emergency it is possible to impose restrictions on the citizens in respect to certain basic rights. In order to avoid the possibility of simple changes of the federal law, the remedy was incorporated in the constitution.

The constitutional complaint is not a popular action. Although everyone can take action, the appellant must meet certain requirements:
The appellant must allege that their above-mentioned constitutional rights have been violated by an act of German (not EU) public authorities (be it executive, judicial or legislative).
The appellant needs to be affected:
himself,
currently, and
immediately.

The latter requirement will normally only be met by constitutional complaints against judgments and against acts of the executive. Laws are normally not self-executing.
As an extraordinary remedy the constitutional complaint is subsidiary to the regular remedies. This means two things. In the first place the appellant must have used every possible other remedy (also the remedy in case of infringement of the claim for hearing). This is why practically, constitutional complaints are mostly directed against judicial acts, not acts of the executive (which can still be contested at the administrative court). Secondly (and the reason why so many complaints are dismissed as inadmissible), the appellant must have already claimed the violation of the above-mentioned rights while making use of the regular remedies.

The complaint must be written. And it is subject to a deadline. Against laws the deadline is one year after the coming into force. For the other cases it is one month after the service / notification.
The appellant can be a legal person, as far as the above-mentioned rights "fit" (Art. 19 Sec. 3 GG).

German constitutional law